Coleophora arenbergerella is a moth of the family Coleophoridae that was described in 1985. It is found on Cyprus.

References

arenbergerella
Moths described in 1985
Moths of Europe